Urup is an uninhabited volcanic island in the Kuril Islands chain in the south of the Sea of Okhotsk, northwest Pacific Ocean. Its name is derived from the Ainu language word for salmon trout.

Geography and climate
Urup is essentially rectangular in shape, with a long axis of 120 kilometers (75 miles) and a narrow axis of about 20 kilometers (12 miles). A number of tiny islets and rocks are scattered around the coast of Urup.

The strait between Urup and Iturup is known as the Vries Strait, after Dutch explorer Maarten Gerritsz Vries, the first recorded European to explore the area. The strait between Urup and Simushir is known as Bussol Strait, after the French word for "compass", which was the name of one of La Pérouse's vessels. This French mariner explored the area of the Kuril Islands in 1787.

Urup consists of four major groups of active or dormant stratovolcanos:
 Kolokol Group, with a height of  has erupted as recently as 1973.
 Tri Sestry, with a height of  has flanks cut by deep ravines and has numerous hot springs.
The southeast-most cone bisects a glacial valley, forming a lake.

Despite its temperate latitude, the cold Oyashio Current and powerful Aleutian Low combine to give Urup a subarctic climate (Köppen Dfc), that is close to a polar climate (Koppen ET) with mild, foggy summers and cold, snowy winters. Urup, like all the Kuril islands, experiences extremely strong seasonal lag, with the highest temperatures in August and September, the lowest in February and temperatures typically in fact warmer at the autumn equinox than at the summer solstice.

Fauna

In the spring and summer crested auklet, tufted puffin, and pigeon guillemot nest on the island; there is also a colony of black-legged kittiwake.

History

Prehistory

Age of Exploration

The first historically attested inhabitants of Urup are the Ainu, the indigenous people of the Kurils, southern Sakhalin and Hokkaidō. 

Europeans are first recorded visiting this part of the Kurils in 1643 when the  under Maarten Gerritsz Vries was exploring Hokkaido and the surrounding area for the Dutch East India Company (VOC). His garbled account of the islands during an era when longitude was difficult to calculate was the origin of the large phantom island Company Land that subsequently appeared on European maps at various positions northeast of Honshu. Named in reference to the VOC, it was considered by Vries to be the northwesternmost projection of North America and its appearance on the maps of the respected cartographers Jan Janssonius, Nicolas Sanson, and Guillaume Delisle spread it through other European maps for another century before more accurate surveys became generally accepted. The original location of Vries's landing is sometimes specifically located on Urup.

Urup is clearly shown on an official Japanese map of 1644, identifying it as part of the territories of the Matsumae clan, a feudal domain of Edo Japan.

18th century
The Matsumae clan holdings were officially confirmed by the Tokugawa shogunate in 1715 and administration of the island came under the Matsumae domain’s regional office location on Kunashir from 1756. Meanwhile, three voyages of Vitus Bering's lieutenant Martin Spanberg in 1738, 1739, and 1742 pointedly failed to find any evidence of Rica de Oro, Rica de Plata, Staten Island, or Company Land in any of the areas claimed for them.

Russian fur traders appeared in the late 18th century, hunting sea otter and seizing foreign ships in the area. There were clashes between the Russians and the Ainu in 1772, and the Russians left for a time, but soon returned. G.F. Muller’s Voyages & Découvertes faites par les Russes (Amsterdam, 1766) contained a list and description of the Kuril Islands, including Urup whose people were said to trade with the Japanese but were not under their control. A small Russian presence was established on Urup by the fur trader Ivan Chernyi in 1768, acting on instructions from the governor of Siberia. During the 1770s it was the base for attempts to establish trade with the Japanese on Yezo (Hokkaido) which came to an end when it was destroyed by a tsunami in June 1780.

19th century
During the decade following 1795, a party of 40 Russian men and women under Zvezdochetov established a colony they called "Slavorossiia" on Urup. In 1801, the Japanese government officially claimed control of the island, incorporating it into Ezo Province (now Hokkaidō Prefecture). This led to a series of clashes with Imperial Russia over Urup and the other Kurils, and sovereignty initially passed to Russia under the terms of the Treaty of Shimoda in 1855. The same year, in an effort to find the Russian fleet in the Pacific Ocean during the Crimean War, a French-British naval force reached the port of Hakodate (open to British ships as a result of the Anglo-Japanese Friendship Treaty of 1854), and sailing further north, landed on Urup, taking official possession of the island as "l'Isle de l'Alliance" and nominating a local Aleut inhabitant as provisional governor. The Treaty of Paris restituted the island to Russian control.

Three whaleships have been wrecked near or on the island: one in 1853 and two in 1855. On the night of 27–28 April 1853, the ship Susan (349 tons), of Nantucket, was stove by ice and sank in Bussol Strait while attempting to enter the Sea of Okhotsk. Two men were lost, one drowning and the other perishing on the ice. The remaining twenty-five crew members crowded into two whaleboats and reached Urup on the afternoon of 29 April. Here they spent eight days before being rescued by the barque Black Warrior, of New London. On 14 May 1855, the ships King Fisher (425 tons), and Enterprise (291 tons), both of New Bedford, were wrecked on a reef on the northeast end of the island while attempting to pass through Bussol Strait into the Sea of Okhotsk. All hands were saved.

Under the Treaty of Saint Petersburg of 1875, sovereignty passed to the Empire of Japan along with the rest of the Kuril islands. The island was formerly administered as part of Uruppu District of Nemuro Subprefecture of Hokkaidō. The remaining local (mainly Aleut) inhabitants were transferred to Kamchatka, according to their will, and replaced by Japanese colonists.

20th century
During World War II, all civilian inhabitants of the island were relocated to the Japanese home islands, and towards the end of the war, the Imperial Japanese Army stationed approximately 6,000 troops on Uruppu, including the IJA 129th Independent Mixed Brigade, 5th Independent Tank Company, 23rd Independent AA Company, 80th Airfield Battalion and 6th Disembarkation Unit. During the Invasion of the Kuril Islands by the Soviet Union after the end of World War II, Japanese forces on Uruppu surrendered without resistance.

In 1952, upon signing the Treaty of San Francisco, Japan renounced its claim to the island. Soviet Border Troops occupied the former Japanese military facilities.  As early as the 1950s, a  P-14 radar "Tall King" VHF air defense radar existed on the far northeastern tip of Urup Island.  The troops were withdrawn upon the dissolution of the Soviet Union in 1991, the co-located airfield was turned into a bombing range.

21st century
The island is now uninhabited and is administered as part of the Sakhalin Oblast of the Russian Federation.

See also
 List of islands of Russia

References

Citations

Bibliography
 .
 .

Further reading
 Gorshkov, G. S. Volcanism and the Upper Mantle Investigations in the Kurile Island Arc. Monographs in geoscience. New York: Plenum Press, 1970. 
 Krasheninnikov, Stepan Petrovich, and James Greive. The History of Kamtschatka and the Kurilski Islands, with the Countries Adjacent. Chicago: Quadrangle Books, 1963.
 Rees, David. The Soviet Seizure of the Kuriles. New York: Praeger, 1985. 
 Stephan, John J., The Kuril Islands, Oxford, Clarendon Press, 1974.
 Takahashi, Hideki, and Masahiro Ōhara. Biodiversity and Biogeography of the Kuril Islands and Sakhalin. Bulletin of the Hokkaido University Museum, no. 2-. Sapporo, Japan: Hokkaido University Museum, 2004.
 Location
 Geographic data
 Picture

 
Islands of the Kuril Islands
Islands of the Sea of Okhotsk
Islands of the Russian Far East
Volcanoes of the Kuril Islands
Uninhabited islands of Russia
Uninhabited islands of the Pacific Ocean